Alan Thomas Doyle   (born May 17, 1969) is a Canadian musician and actor, best known as the lead singer of the Canadian folk rock band Great Big Sea.

Life and career
Alan Doyle was born and raised in Petty Harbour, Newfoundland, in a Roman Catholic family. He attended Memorial University of Newfoundland in St. John's, where he received a Bachelor of Arts degree in English. It is also there that he met Séan McCann, Bob Hallett and Darrell Power with whom he formed Great Big Sea. He primarily plays electric and acoustic guitars, and the bouzouki for live performances, but he has been known to play mandolin and banjo.

Before Great Big Sea, Doyle played in a duo with John Brenton called Staggering Home. As a teen he played in his uncle's band, the New Sandells.

Doyle has also been involved with a handful of stage, television and film productions. As a child, he appeared as an extra in the movie A Whale for the Killing, based on Farley Mowat's book of the same name, which was filmed in his hometown. He has also hosted regional arts awards shows in Atlantic Canada, appeared as a presenter on the Juno Awards and done a turn onstage in his hometown's "24-Hour Musical" performance of Grease. In 2005, he composed music for the CBC comedy Hatching, Matching and Dispatching, which stars Mary Walsh. In 2006, he worked on scoring the film Young Triffie's Been Made Away With, directed by Walsh. Doyle has also produced an album for his sister, Michelle Doyle.

Doyle has been linked to Russell Crowe and his bands 30 Odd Foot of Grunts and The Ordinary Fear of God, having produced and co-written several songs on Crowe's album, My Hand, My Heart, and played several shows with Crowe. In 2011, they released The Crowe/Doyle Songbook Vol.III with 9 songs in both acoustic demo and finished format, for 18 tracks total. This friendship also led to Doyle's casting as Allan A'Dayle alongside Crowe, Cate Blanchett, Kevin Durand, and Scott Grimes in Ridley Scott's Robin Hood, released May 14, 2010. He played Dingy in the film Winter's Tale, also with Crowe and Durand, as well as Will Smith and Colin Farrell.

He collaborated with Law & Order music composer Mike Post and wrote and performed a song named "Middle of Nowhere", written for the Law & Order: Criminal Intent episode "Broad Channel".

Doyle has guest starred on three episodes of the CBC Television series Republic of Doyle as the character Wolf Redmond. Season 2, episode 2 introduced him as an inmate sent to prison on charges of B&Es and a few robberies. Doyle guest starred with Russell Crowe, Kevin Durand, and Scott Grimes on the first show of Republic of Doyles third season after the four had costarred on Robin Hood. His third appearance – the second with Grimes – was on season 4, episode 6.  He appeared in an episode of Murdoch Mysteries''' tenth season.

In 2012, Doyle released his first solo album, Boy on Bridge. The title is a nod to Doyle's credit as the "boy on bridge" in the movie A Whale for the Killing, when he was a young boy. The first single from the album is "I've Seen a Little" and the album features collaborations with Canadian musicians Hawksley Workman, Jim Cuddy, Ron Hynes, and actor-musician Russell Crowe, among others. The video for the second single, "Testify", was nominated for a 2012 Juno. The creation of the album was captured by a film crew, resulting in a documentary also named Boy on Bridge directed by Joel Stewart and John Vatcher.

Doyle, with Great Big Sea, was featured on Canadian country artist, Dean Brody's 2012 album titled Dirt, singing on the track "It's Friday".

In 2014, Doyle released a book entitled Where I Belong, about his youth growing up in Newfoundland and Labrador.

Doyle's second solo album, entitled So Let's Go, was released January 20, 2015.

In 2017, he guest starred in a Murdoch Mysteries episode, "A Murdog Mystery" as a man who claims to be a time travelling historian. Doyle reprised the role in the web series "Beyond Time".

Doyle's third solo album A Week at the Warehouse, was released on October 13, 2017. His second book titled A Newfoundlander in Canada: Always Going Somewhere, Always Coming Home, was released on October 17.

On June 14, 2022 he will begin starring in a musical comedy called Tell Tale Harbour at the 2022 Charlottetown Festival. The story is based on the screenplay La grande séduction by Ken Scott that was made into the 2003 award winning film Seducing Doctor Lewis''. Doyle was co-writer of the production as well as co-writer of music and lyrics with Bob Foster. Also credited as one of the authors for a book of the musical with award-winning writer Edward Riche.

Discography

Albums

Extended plays

Singles

Guest singles

Music videos

Honours
 Canadian Version of the Queen Elizabeth II Diamond Jubilee Medal in 2012.
 Member of the Order of Canada (CM) on May 10, 2018.
 Member of the Order of Newfoundland and Labrador on October 4, 2022.

References

External links

 
 Photo portrait Alan Thomas Doyle on greatbigsea.com retrieved November 23, 2011
Official Biography
Official site for the album My Hand, My Heart 
INTERVIEW: Robin Hood's Merry Men | Rip It Up Magazine
 

1969 births
Living people
20th-century Canadian male singers
21st-century Canadian male singers
Canadian folk rock musicians
Canadian folk singers
Canadian male guitarists
Canadian male singers
Canadian rock guitarists
Canadian rock singers
Canadian songwriters
Great Big Sea members
Male actors from Newfoundland and Labrador
Members of the Order of Canada
Musicians from Newfoundland and Labrador
People from Newfoundland (island)